Mark Joseph Bego (born on September 23, 1952, in Pontiac, Michigan) is an author known for his biographies focusing on the rock & roll and show business genres. Bego has written a total of 59 books, two of which have gone on to become New York Times Best Sellers. Bego has written biographies about some of entertainment's biggest stars, including: Linda Ronstadt, Elton John, Aretha Franklin, Elvis Presley, Michael Jackson, Madonna, Billy Joel, Patsy Cline, Leonardo DiCaprio, and Whitney Houston.

From 1978 to 1980, he was the Nightlife Editor for Manhattan's Cue, covering everything from Studio 54 to all of the jazz and cabaret clubs in the city. From 1983 to 1985, he was editor-in-chief of Modern Screen. His writing has also appeared in People, US, Billboard, Record World, Cosmopolitan, Star, and National Enquirer.

Bego's book on singer Michael Jackson, titled For Michael!, was released a week after the infamous Pepsi Cola commercial in which Jackson's hair caught fire. The book sold three million copies in the United States alone and landed on the New York Times Best Sellers for six weeks. Bego also had the chance to travel with Jackson and his brothers on the "Victory!" Tour, and subsequently wrote the book On The Road With Michael!

He has also written books with Micky Dolenz of The Monkees (I’m a Believer), Debbie Gibson (Between the Lines), and Jimmy Greenspoon of Three Dog Night (One is the Loneliest Number). In addition, Bego has written a book called One Minute Before Midnight with Ruth Mueller. Bego's book subjects have ranged from Elvis Presley, Linda Ronstadt, Whitney Houston, Bonnie Raitt, Julia Roberts, Joni Mitchell, Billy Joel, and Jackson Browne to Cher and Bette Midler. In 1994, his more general books published included Country Gals (life stories of Reba McEntire, Dolly Parton, Tanya Tucker, and other famed women in country music, and Country Hunks (spotlighting Vince Gill, Billy Ray Cyrus, George Strait and others). Bego also authored the reference books TV Rock (The History of Rock & Roll on Television) and The Rock & Roll Almanac. He has also written books about Hollywood in its heyday The Best of "Modern Screen", and Rock Hudson: Public and Private. Bego wrote a memoir with Memphis Mafia member Lamar Fike called An Uncommon Journey: On Elvis Presley Boulevard. He co-wrote a screenplay based on the book called '57 to '60: One of the Boys.

At the height of the box-office success of the film Titanic, Bego wrote the biography of the movie’s star, Leonardo DiCaprio: A Romantic Hero. It spent six weeks on The New York Times best-seller list in 1998.

In 2008, Bego published his 51th pop culture book, written with Randy Jones of Village People, entitled Macho Man. Recently, Bego penned his own showbusiness memoir, Paperback Writer. Cindy Adams in The New York Post wrote about the book, "Paperback Writer ... a tell-all telling things he couldn't tell in previous books – like Aretha Franklin cooking chicken, and when the chicken was finished, so was the interview." Paperback Writer hit Number Two on The Book Soup paperback Best Seller List. Bego frequently is seen on television speaking about showbusiness, on such shows as Entertainment Tonight, Biography, and True Hollywood Story.

In 2009 Bego released a biography of Elton John. In the summer of 2009, Bego appeared on ABC talking about Michael Jackson's death.

References

External links
 

American biographers
American male biographers
Living people
1952 births
People from Pontiac, Michigan